Household name may refer to:

 Household Name (album), a studio album by Momma
 a popular brand, see brand awareness
 a popular person, see celebrity
 a term misused to exaggerate a product, see promotion

See also 
 House name (disambiguation)
 Household Names, American rock band in Austin, Texas